Convective self-aggregation is an atmospheric phenomenon that occurs under idealized conditions such as the tropical ocean where the sea surface temperature is approximately constant. During convective self-aggregation a homogenous atmosphere transition into one region that is very dry and cloud-free and one region with heavy rain and thunderstorm. Convective self-aggregation is, therefore, important in the formation of tropical cyclones, and data indicate that cold pools play a major role in starting it.

References 

Severe weather and convection